Pseudocalotes dringi, also known commonly as Dring's false bloodsucker and Dring's false garden lizard, is a species of lizard in the family Agamidae. The species is endemic to Malaysia.

Etymology
The specific name, dringi, is in honor of British herpetologist Julian Christopher Mark Dring.

Geographic range
P. dringi is found in Peninsular Malaysia.

Habitat

Behavior
P. dringi is diurnal and arboreal.

Reproduction
P. dringi is oviparous.

References

Further reading
Grismer LL, Quah ESH (2019). "An updated and annotated checklist of the lizards of Peninsular Malaysia, Singapore, and their adjacent archipelagos". Zootaxa 4545 (2): 230–248.
Hallermann J, Böhme W (2000). "A review of the genus Pseudocalotes (Squamata: Agamidae), with description of a new species from West Malaysia". Amphibia-Reptilia 21 (2): 193–210. (Pseudocalotes dringi, new species).
Manthey U (2010). Agamid Lizards of Southern Asia, Draconinae 2, Leiolepidinae. Terralog Volume 7b. Frankfurt am Main, Germany: Edition Chimaira. 168 pp. .

Pseudocalotes
Reptiles of Malaysia
Reptiles described in 2000
Taxa named by Jakob Hallermann
Taxa named by Wolfgang Böhme (herpetologist)